Persitangsel stands for Persatuan Sepakbola Indonesia Tangerang Selatan (en: Football Association of Indonesia South Tangerang). Persitangsel is an  Indonesian football club based in South Tangerang , Banten. They play in Liga 3.

Honours
 Liga 3 Banten
 Champion: 2017

References

External links

South Tangerang
Sport in Banten
Football clubs in Indonesia
Football clubs in Banten
Association football clubs established in 2009
2009 establishments in Indonesia